Lieutenant colonel Cleveland Edmund Greenway (29 October 1864 – 17 June 1934) was British Army officer and amateur cricketer who played two first-class matches; one for Somerset County Cricket Club, and the other for the Marylebone Cricket Club.

Life and cricket career
Greenway was born in Buenos Aires, Argentina, on 29 October 1864. He was educated at Cheltenham College where he played for the school's cricket team, appearing against Clifton College and Marlborough College in each of 1881 and 1882. An opening batsman, he enjoyed some success in 1881, scoring a half-century, and narrowly missing out on another. He was captain of the school eleven in 1882. Later in 1882 he played a solitary first-class match for Somerset County Cricket Club, batting as part of the top order against the Marylebone Cricket Club (MCC). He was one of only three players to reach double-figures for Somerset in the first innings, scoring 18, but only scored one run in the second innings of the match.

He travelled as part of George Vernon's team to tour Ceylon and India in the English winter of 1889–90, playing as an opening batsman and wicket-keeper. The highlight of his tour was the unbeaten 130 that he scored against the Calcutta Club in the first match of the tour. Later, he played a number of matches against second-class counties for the MCC. One MCC match in 1895, against Essex, was his second and final first-class game: he scored 8 and 4 in a low-scoring match that was over inside two days. Later he appeared in the Minor Counties Championship for Northumberland from 1900 to 1902. In late 1913, aged 48, Greenway captained the Incogniti team on a tour of North America. He batted low in the order during this time, and did not play any notable cricket after the tour.

On 14 July 1916 Greenway's only son, Lieutenant Thomas Cleveland Greenway, Royal Navy, married Lady Sheelah King-Tennison, elder daughter of Henry Edwyn King-Tenison, 9th Earl of Kingston at St Mark's, North Audley Street, London. Greenway died at West Wickham, Kent on 17 June 1934.

Army career
Sometime prior to 1884 he joined the British Army. On 12 November 1884 he transferred, as a lieutenant, from 3rd Battalion, Bedfordshire Regiment to the King's (Liverpool) Regiment. He served with the 2nd battalion of his regiment in the Third Anglo-Burmese War in 1885–87, and was promoted captain on 19 November 1890. On 15 December 1897 he was seconded to act as adjutant to a Volunteer Force unit, the 1st Volunteer Battalion of the Northumberland Fusiliers. He was promoted major on 21 March 1900, but remained as adjutant of volunteers. Sometime before 27 August 1902 he transferred his regular army commission to the Worcestershire Regiment, and on that date he retired from regular army service, at the same time stepping down as adjutant of the 1 Volunteer battalion, Northumberland Fusiliers.

On 1 July 1906 he was appointed brigade major of a brigade of volunteer infantry of the Royal Fusiliers, and on 1 April 1907 he was promoted lieutenant colonel and given command of a Militia battalion, 5th Battalion, Rifle Brigade (Prince Consort's Own). Following the creation of the Special Reserve under the Haldane Reforms of 1908 he remained in command when the battalion transferred from the Militia, and was also made honorary colonel. He retained command until 1 April 1913, the end of the standard six-year period of command. During the First World War, he was recalled to service and appointed a Draft Conducting Officer on 23 July 1915, to take a group of reinforcements to France, he arrived in France on 27 July, qualifying him for the 1914–15 Star. He relinquished that appointment on 9 August 1915,
 and on 7 December 1916 was appointed to command the regimental depot of the East Surrey Regiment at Kingston upon Thames.

References

1864 births
1934 deaths
British Army personnel of World War I
English cricketers
Marylebone Cricket Club cricketers
People educated at Cheltenham College
Somerset cricketers
Northumberland cricketers
King's Regiment (Liverpool) officers
Bedfordshire and Hertfordshire Regiment officers
Worcestershire Regiment officers
Sportspeople from Gloucestershire